Terrible Joe Moran is a 1984 American made-for-television drama film directed by Joseph Sargent and starring James Cagney in his final role, Art Carney, and Ellen Barkin.  The film, about an aging ex-boxer (Cagney) who needs to use a wheelchair for mobility, won an Emmy Award in 1984. Clips from Cagney's 1932 boxing picture Winner Take All were used to illustrate the character's earlier career.
Reportedly, impressionist Rich Little dubbed much—if not all—of the Cagney dialog, as the stroke afflicted actor slurred his words and the decision was made to replace his voice with that of Little doing a Cagney impersonation.

The script was originally written for Katharine Hepburn.  After she bowed out, the lead part was rewritten for Cagney.

Cast
James Cagney as Joe Moran
Art Carney as Tony
Ellen Barkin as Ronnie
Peter Gallagher as Nick
Lawrence Tierney as Pico
Floyd Patterson as Himself
Edward I. Koch as Moe
Terrance Ellis as Young Hopeful (as Terry Ellis)
Peter DeAnello as Young Boxer
Susan Lowden as Lady with Dog
Anna Berger as Real Estate Agent
 Andrew MacMillan as Announcer
Maurice Shrog as Benny the Wino
Mike Starr as 1st Thug
Joe Seneca as Pittsburgh Billy
David Wohl as Meat Handler

References

External links

1984 television films
1984 films
1984 drama films
American drama films
CBS network films
Films directed by Joseph Sargent
1980s American films